James Harry Dean (May 12, 1915 – June 1, 1960) was a Major League Baseball pitcher.

External links

1915 births
1960 deaths
Baseball players from Georgia (U.S. state)
Major League Baseball pitchers
Oglethorpe Stormy Petrels baseball players
Washington Senators (1901–1960) players
People from Rockmart, Georgia
Sportspeople from the Atlanta metropolitan area